She's Dope may refer to:

"She's Dope" (Down with Webster song)
"She's Dope!" (Bell Biv DeVoe song)